Hans van Goor (born 1970 in Zwaag, North Holland) is a retired Dutch long distance swimmer who won a silver medal at the 1993 European Championships. He also swam the English Channel on 4 September 1995 in a time of 8 h and 02 mins, which stood as a European record until 2003. He is the coach and husband of fellow long-distance swimmer Edith van Dijk. 

Van Goor studied econometrics and law at the Vrije Universiteit, Amsterdam. He is Chief Operating Officer at the sports-oriented DSB Bank, where he has been employed since 1994. Since early 2019 Hans van Goor took a position of CEO of the Dutch startup company, related to Discoperi Inc.

References

1970 births
Living people
People from Zwaag
Dutch corporate directors
Dutch male long-distance swimmers
English Channel swimmers
Chief operating officers
Sportspeople from North Holland
20th-century Dutch people